"Brown Robyn's Confession" is Child ballad 57.

Synopsis
Brown Robyn goes to sea.  On board ship, they are unable to see any lights in the sky.  They "cast kevels" (drew lots) which indicated that the problem was because of Brown Robyn.  He confesses to incestous relations with his mother (who bore him two children) and his sister (who bore five), or, in other variants, to killing his father.  He tells them to tie him to a piece of wood and let him sink or swim.  

He swims.  Our Blessed Lady, with her "dear young son", appears to him and asks him if he would return to his men or come to heaven with her and her child.  He asks to go to heaven.  She tells him that it is not for any good he has done but for confessing his sin that he may come.

Motifs
This is the only instance in the ballad collection of a very common folk legend, of the Virgin Mary.  This is also found in Norway, Denmark, and Sweden, but the ballad usually ends tragically for the hero; only one instance saves him, also by a supernatural intervention. 

The motif of the lots and throwing a person from the ship may be derived from the tale of Jonah.  Another ballad featuring these motifs is Bonnie Annie, Child ballad 24.  It also appears in the Russian fairy tale Sadko, where Sadko must jump overboard to appease the King of the Sea.

See also
List of the Child Ballads

References

External links
Brown Robyn’s Confession
Scottish National Dictionary - Definition of Kevel

Child Ballads